Vladica Babić (born 27 October 1995) is an inactive Montenegrin professional tennis player.

Playing for Montenegro Fed Cup team, she has a win–loss record of 5–9.

Babić was studying at Oklahoma State University, between 2015 and 2018.

ITF Circuit finals

Singles: 2 (2 titles)

Doubles: 16 (9 titles, 7 runner–ups)

National representation

Fed Cup
Babić made her Fed Cup debut for Montenegro in 2011, while the team was competing in the Europe/Africa Zone Group III, when she was 15 years and 193 days old.

Fed Cup (5–9)

Singles (4–5)

Doubles (1–4)

Games of the Small States of Europe

Singles: 1 (win)

Mixed doubles: 1 (runner-up)

References

External links
 
 
 

1995 births
Living people
Montenegrin female tennis players
Sportspeople from Podgorica
Oklahoma State Cowgirls tennis players